Sandeep Chaudhary (born 10 April 1996) is an Indian track and field para-athlete who competes in javelin throw.

He is supported by GoSports Foundation under the Para Champions Programme.

Career
The previous world record was set in 1980 by Chinese athlete Gao Mingjie.

References

External links
 
 
 

Indian male javelin throwers
Paralympic athletes of India
Indian sportsmen
1996 births
Living people
Recipients of the Arjuna Award
Athletes (track and field) at the 2016 Summer Paralympics
Athletes (track and field) at the 2020 Summer Paralympics